Cristina Dorcioman (born 7 August 1974) is a Romanian football referee.

On 26 July 2013, Dorcioman was announced referee for the 2013 UEFA Women's Euro Final between Germany and Norway at Friends Arena in Solna, Sweden. During the competition, she has taken charge of two group stage matches.

She also refereed the semi-final first leg between Duisburg and Turbine Potsdam in the 2010–11 UEFA Women's Champions League season, and other three same competition quarter-finals.

In 2009 she went to the UEFA Women's Euro and a year before was in charge for the 2008 UEFA Women's Under-19 Championship Final between Italy and Norway.

References

External links
Profile on Liga I
Profile at worldfootball.net 
Football Tactics and Lineups Database profile 
Interview on FRF-CCA

Living people
1974 births
Sportspeople from Câmpulung
Romanian football referees
Women association football referees